Celestin may refer to:

 Celestin (given name), a masculine given name
 Celestin (surname), a surname

See also
 Celestina (disambiguation)
 Celestine (disambiguation)
 Celestino, a surname and given name
 Saint-Célestin (disambiguation)